PBCom Rural Bank, formerly Banco Dipolog, Inc., was the 54th rural bank opened in the Philippines after the enactment of the Rural Banking Act of 1952. The late Justice Florentino Saguin, with the strong support of his son, Atty. Augusto “Tuting” Saguin, originally established it as the Rural Bank of Dipolog, Inc. (RBDI) on October 17, 1957, and opened its welcoming doors to the banking public on November 2, 1957.

History

Rural Bank of Dipolog, Incorporated (1957 to 2010)
Banco Dipolog started in 1957 by Justice Florentino Saguin who retired from government service due to his various capacities. Having his retirement funds, he was given an option together with his son Augusto G. Saguin if they would investing a lot in Makati City, or to put up his funds for the establishment of a Rural Bank in Dipolog. Florentino said to his son, ”I want to spend what little time I have left and what little resources I possess for the benefit of the small people from where I came.” And so the decision was final.

Complying with all the requirements of the Central Bank and the Securities and Exchange Commission the Rural Bank of Dipolog, Inc. was granted its charter in October 1957 and was inaugurated on November 2, 1957.

They started with a “paid in capital” of only Php 50,000. with a rented office at the Lacaya Building which was the only concrete building of consequence in Dipolog at the time. Justice Florentino Saguin was the first Bank President. His only previous exposure at finance was as Chairman of the Mindanao Emergency Currency Board which printed and issued Emergency Money for the use of the Guerrilla movement in Mindanao and to support the local economy during the war. This was the so-called “Saguin Money”.

They started with a manpower of only three people with Augusto as the Manager, Mrs. Gregoria Espiritu, CPA as the Bookkeeper – Accountant, and Mrs. Araceli Zapanta as Cashier – Teller. The workings and methods of Rural Banking then were so simplified and was so designed for untrained folks to do in the rural areas.

In 1965, Justice Florentino Saguin died and the management was passed on to his wife, Doña Consuelo Galleposo Saguin. Doña Consuelo spent the last ten years of her life in proficiently nurturing the viability of the bank at its early growth stage until a fine – tuned change of leadership was experienced by the bank after her death.

In June 1975, following the death of Doña Consuelo, the son who then became an attorney, Atty. Augusto Saguin, formally took his sublime oath as chairman and President. At his management, the bank was cited by Bangko Sentral ng Pilipinas as the Top Rural Bank for Region IX in 1989.

RBDI expanded in the 1990s. In 1998, a branch in Dapitan opened on January 8, then in Sindangan on July 8. In 2000, it started offering its consumer loan products as such as their microfinance which they dubbed as “TIGUM” (Visayan: to collect) or “Tubag sa Gikinahanglan Ug Magmalambuon” (Visayan: A solution for the needy abound) loan product. At that time it was the first and only accredited rural bank of the Microenterprise Access to Banking Services (MABS) within the province. More branches and “other banking offices” were later opened within the provinces of Zamboanga Sibugay, Misamis Occidental and Zamboanga del Sur.

In 2009, Atty. Augusto G. Saguin pass the management to Mr. Jude Martin Raymund B. Saguin whom was elected as the President and chairman of the board of directors. The granddaughter of Atty. Saguin, Ms. Ma. Katrina Francesca S. Herrera was designated as the Vice President for Administration and Finance.

Banco Dipolog, Incorporated (2010 to 2018)
On April 17, 2010, the name Rural Bank of Dipolog was rebranded to what is now the Banco Dipolog, Inc. As of September 30, 2010, RBDI ranks 14th in terms of total capital, 29th in terms of total gross loan portfolio and 42nd in terms of total assets among over 600 rural banks.

PBCom Acquisition 
In 2014, The Philippine Bank of Communications (PBCOM) signed a memorandum of agreement with the Controlling Stockholders of Banco Dipolog. The agreement will give PBCOM a majority stake of Banco Dipolog, subject to the Central Bank's approval. PBCOM President and CEO Nina D. Aguas said that PBCOM's investment in Banco Dipolog will allow PBCOM to strengthen its presence in Mindanao, while bringing Banco Dipolog's client base an expanded suite of products and services that PBCOM offers as a commercial bank.

Producers Bank acquisition (2018 to 2019)
In 2018, Banco Dipolog, Inc. is officially renamed as PBCom Rural Bank.
In 2019, Producers Savings Bank Corporation acquired ninety-nine point ninety-eight percent (99.98%) of PBCom Rural Bank's stock capital making the rural bank a fully owned subsidiary until it is merged with Producers Bank.

Branches 
To date, they have 16 branches and 9 Branch Lites, nationwide:
 Dipolog (Main Office)
 Dapitan
 Sindangan, Zamboanga Del Norte
 Ipil, Zamboanga sibugay
 Pagadian City
 Dumaguete
 Cebu City
 Ozamiz City
 Cagayan de Oro
 Iligan City
 Valencia City, Bukidnon
 City of Calamba, Laguna
 Los Baños, Laguna
 Imelda, Zamboanga Sibugay
 Nagcarlan, Laguna
 San Pablo, Laguna

Branch Lites
 Mandaue City, Cebu
 Aurora, Zamboanga del Sur
 Calamba, Misamis Occidental
 Liloy, Zamboanga del Norte
 Manukan, Zamboanga del Norte
 Manukan, Zamboanga del Sur
 Oroquieta City
 Piñan, Zamboanga del Norte
 Siayan, Zamboanga del Norte

See also 
 Producers Bank
 List of banks in the Philippines

References 

Banks established in 1957
Banks of the Philippines
Companies based in Dipolog